Prabhuram Choudhary is an Indian politician and a member of Bharatiya Janata Party. He is a Member of Madhya Pradesh Legislative Assembly from Sanchi in Raisen District. He is currently serving as Public Health and Family Welfare minister of Madhya pradesh in Shivraj Singh Chouhan's 2020 Cabinet.

Prabhuram Chaudhary was born on 15 July 1958 in Mala village of Raisen district. Son of Shri Balmukand Chaudhary, Prabhuram Choudhary received MBBS education. His main occupation is agriculture and trade. 
Choudhary has special interest in sports. He has been the "Games and Sports" Secretary of Gandhi Medical College, Bhopal and captain of their Volleyball team.

At the age of 27, Choudhary was elected Member of the 8th Legislative Assembly for the first time in the year 1985 and was a Parliamentary Secretary in 1989, becoming one of the youngest members at that time. Continuing his political career he later became the member of the Madhya Pradesh Congress Committee's Executive body in the year 1991, Joint Secretary in the year 1996 and the General Secretary in the year 1998. Choudhary was also convener of the Scheduled Caste and Scheduled Tribe Division of Madhya Pradesh Congress Committee and member of All India Congress Committee in 1994. He was a member of the Central Co-operative Bank, Raisen and a member of District Panchayat Raisen in 2004.

Choudhary was elected as member of the Assembly for the second time in the year 2008. He was elected for the third time for the Vidhan Sabha from Sanchi assembly constituency in 2018.

See also
 2020 Madhya Pradesh political crisis

References

Living people
Madhya Pradesh MLAs 2008–2013
Indian National Congress politicians from Madhya Pradesh
Madhya Pradesh MLAs 2018–2023
Bharatiya Janata Party politicians from Madhya Pradesh
1958 births